The Ormyridae are a small family of parasitic wasps in the superfamily Chalcidoidea. They are either parasitoids or hyperparasitoids on gall-forming insects, primarily cynipid wasps and tephritid flies. The 120 or so species in three genera (mostly in the genus Ormyrus) are cosmopolitan, except almost entirely absent from South America.

They are best recognized by distinctive scalloped sculpturing of their metasomal tergites.

External links
Universal Chalcidoidea Database
Ormyridae at Waspweb

Chalcidoidea
Taxa named by Arnold Förster
Apocrita families